The 1993–94 Czech Extraliga season was the inaugural season of the Czech Extraliga, following the peaceful dissolution of Czechoslovakia midway through the 1992–93 Czechoslovak Extraliga season (which all Slovak and Czech teams played to completion).

Standings

Playoffs

Quarterfinals

HC Poldi SONP Kladno (1) - (8) HC Chemopetrol Litvínov

 HC Poldi SONP Kladno - HC Chemopetrol Litvínov 4:5 (1:1,3:2,0:2)
 HC Poldi SONP Kladno - HC Chemopetrol Litvínov 3:2 (2:1,0:1,1:0)
 HC Chemopetrol Litvínov - HC Poldi SONP Kladno 1:4 (1:1,0:1,0:2)
 HC Chemopetrol Litvínov - HC Poldi SONP Kladno 2:7 (0:2,0:4,2:1)

HC České Budějovice (2) - (7) HC Olomouc

 HC České Budějovice - HC Olomouc 1:3 (0:0,0:2,1:1)
 HC České Budějovice - HC Olomouc 2:5 (2:3,0:1,0:1)
 HC Olomouc - HC České Budějovice 4:2 (1:1,0:1,3:0)

HC Vítkovice (3) - (6) HC Pardubice

 HC Vítkovice - HC Pardubice 5:4 (0:1,4:0,1:3)
 HC Vítkovice - HC Pardubice 2:5 (1:1,1:2,0:2)
 HC Pardubice - HC Vítkovice 2:1 SN (1:1,0:0,0:0,0:0)
 HC Pardubice - HC Vítkovice 4:5 PP (2:3,2:0,0:1,0:1)
 HC Vítkovice - HC Pardubice 1:3 (0:0,0:1,1:2)

AC ZPS Zlín (4) - (5) HC Sparta Praha

 AC ZPS Zlín - HC Sparta Praha 2:3 (1:2,1:0,0:1)
 AC ZPS Zlín - HC Sparta Praha 3:5 (1:0,1:3,1:2)
 HC Sparta Praha - AC ZPS Zlín 10:0 (5:0,3:0,2:0)

Semifinals

HC Poldi SONP Kladno (1) - (7) HC Olomouc

 HC Poldi SONP Kladno - HC Olomouc 4:1 (2:0,1:1,1:0)
 HC Poldi SONP Kladno - HC Olomouc 4:1 (0:1,2:0,2:0)
 HC Olomouc - HC Poldi SONP Kladno 5:4 (3:0,1:3,1:1)
 HC Olomouc - HC Poldi SONP Kladno 6:3 (3:1,0:0,3:2)
 HC Poldi SONP Kladno - HC Olomouc 5:6 SN (4:4,0:1,1:0,0:0)

HC Sparta Praha (5) - (6) HC Pardubice

 HC Sparta Praha - HC Pardubice 2:3 SN (0:0,2:1,0:1,0:0)
 HC Sparta Praha - HC Pardubice 0:1 (0:1,0:0,0:0)
 HC Pardubice - HC Sparta Praha 2:1 SN (1:1,0:0,0:0,0:0)

3rd place

HC Poldi SONP Kladno (1) - (5) HC Sparta Praha

 HC Sparta Praha - HC Poldi SONP Kladno 3:9 (2:4,1:1,0:4)
 HC Poldi SONP Kladno - HC Sparta Praha 7:5 (1:2,4:2,2:1)

Finals

HC Pardubice (6) - (7) HC Olomouc

HC Olomouc - HC Pardubice 2–3, 2–1, 5–2, 2-1

HC Olomouc is Czech champion for the 1993–94 season.

Play-Downs

HC Škoda Plzeň (9) - (12) HC Jindřichův Hradec

 HC Škoda Plzeň - HC Jindřichův Hradec 5-1
 HC Škoda Plzeň - HC Jindřichův Hradec 4-3 OT
 HC Jindřichův Hradec - HC Škoda Plzeň 1-0
 HC Jindřichův Hradec - HC Škoda Plzeň 2-3 SO

 HC Dukla Jihlava (10) - (11) HC Hradec Králové 
HC Dukla Jihlava - HC Hradec Králové 6-3
HC Dukla Jihlava - HC Hradec Králové 3-1
HC Hradec Králové - HC Dukla Jihlava 3-1
HC Hradec Králové -  HC Dukla Jihlava 4-7

Relegation

References

External links 
 

Czech Extraliga seasons
1993–94 in Czech ice hockey
Czech